Magnetograph may refer to:
 Solar magnetograph, an instrument that produces solar magnetograms
 Survey magnetograph, a survey magnetometer that continuously records the time-variation in the geomagnetic field

Magnetic devices